Tisová refers to the following places in the Czech Republic:

 Tisová (Tachov District)
 Tisová (Ústí nad Orlicí District)